Francesco Prando (born 22 February 1960) is an Italian actor.

Biography
Prando was born in Rome to actors Marcello Prando and Luciana Durante. His maternal grandparents were actors Checco and Anita Durante. As a voice actor, Prando is renowned for dubbing over the voices of Luke Perry, Vince Vaughn, Guy Pearce and Matthew McConaughey. He has also dubbed over Keanu Reeves, Daniel Craig, Jason Statham, Paul Rudd, Michael Fassbender and many more. Some of his popular dubbing roles include Will Truman (portrayed by Eric McCormack) in the Italian version of Will & Grace.

In Prando's animated roles, he voiced Ned Flanders in the Italian dub of The Simpsons since Season 4, replacing Pino Insegno. He also performed the Italian voices of Prince Charming in the Shrek films, Phineas T. Ratchet in Robots, Li Shang in Mulan and more.

Filmography

Cinema
Oltre la notte (1993)
L'anniversario (1999)
Another World (2010)
ACAB – All Cops Are Bastards (2012)

Television
La piovra,  (1995)
Don Milani il priore di Barbiana (1997) - TV Film
Enchantment (2000-2006)
Squadra antimafia – Palermo oggi (2014) - 3 episodes 
Squadra mobile (2017)

Dubbing roles

Animation
Ned Flanders in The Simpsons (season 4+)
Ned Flanders in The Simpsons Movie
Lion-O in ThunderCats
Winston in 44 Cats
Prince Charming in Shrek 2
Prince Charming in Shrek the Third
John Rolfe in Pocahontas II: Journey to a New World
Phineas T. Ratchet in Robots
Wenlock in Barbie and the Magic of Pegasus
Roddy St. James in Flushed Away
Li Shang in Mulan
Li Shang in Mulan II
Pongo in 101 Dalmatians II: Patch's London Adventure
Buster Moon in Sing
Buster Moon in Sing 2
Derek Dietl in Monsters vs. Aliens
King Arthur in Quest for Camelot
Wile E. Coyote in Looney Tunes (1996-2006)
Wile E. Coyote in The Bugs Bunny/Road Runner Movie (1999 redub)

Live action
John "Sheriff" Volgecherev in Return to Paradise
Norman Bates in Psycho
Lester Long in Clay Pigeons
Rick Barnes in Domestic Disturbance
Ricky Slade in Made
Peter LaFleur in DodgeBall: A True Underdog Story
Raji Lowenthal in Be Cool
Eddie in Mr. & Mrs. Smith
Gary Grobowski in The Break-Up
Dave in Couples Retreat
Ronny Valentine in The Dilemma
Bob McAllister in The Watch
Rosie in Lay the Favorite
Nick Campbell in The Internship
Alan in A Case of You
David Wozniak in Delivery Man
Dan Trunkman in Unfinished Business
Howell in Hacksaw Ridge
Hutch Morgan in Fighting with My Family
Frank Semyon in True Detective
Roger Sherman Baldwin in Amistad
Andrew Tyler in U-571
Steve Edison in The Wedding Planner
Troy in Thirteen Conversations About One Thing
Steven Bedalia in Tiptoes
Jack Lengyel in We Are Marshall
Connor Mead in Ghosts of Girlfriends Past
Mickey Haller in The Lincoln Lawyer
Joe Cooper in Killer Joe
Mark Hanna in The Wolf of Wall Street
Ward Jansen in The Paperboy
Mud in Mud
Ron Woodroof in Dallas Buyers Club
Joseph Cooper in Interstellar
Arthur Brennan in The Sea of Trees
Newton Knight in Free State of Jones
Kenny Wells in Gold
Walter Padick in The Dark Tower
John Mason / Baker Dill in Serenity
Brett in Dating the Enemy
Ed Exley in L.A. Confidential
Alexander Hartdegen in The Time Machine
Aidan McRory in Two Brothers
Charlie Burns in The Proposition
Jimmy Starks in First Snow
Andy Warhol in Factory Girl
Matthew Thompson in The Hurt Locker
Roy Clayton in Traitor
Kendall Duncan in Bedtime Stories
Alex Hurst in Don't Be Afraid of the Dark
Simon in Seeking Justice
Marion Snow in Lockout
Aldrich Killian in Iron Man 3
Jonas in Equals
Evan Birch in Spinning Man
Robert Furman in The Catcher Was a Spy
Joe Martin in Domino
Dylan McKay in Beverly Hills, 90210
Fred Andrews in Riverdale
Luke Perry in Christmas Vacation '95
Chris Anderson in Normal Life
Billy Masterson in The Fifth Element
Ron Young in Storm
Wayne Maunder in Once Upon a Time in Hollywood
Will Truman in Will & Grace
Sam Field in Borrowed Hearts
Mason McGuire in Trust Me
Daniel J. Pierce in Perception
Grant MacLaren in Travelers
Erik Lehnsherr / Magneto in X-Men: First Class
Erik Lehnsherr / Magneto in X-Men: Days of Future Past
Erik Lehnsherr / Magneto in X-Men: Apocalypse
Erik Lehnsherr / Magneto in X-Men: Dark Phoenix
Archie Hicox in Inglourious Basterds
Quintus Dias in Centurion
Brandon Sullivan in Shame
Edward Fairfax Rochester in Jane Eyre
Paul in Haywire
David 8 in Prometheus
David 8 / Walter 1 in Alien: Covenant
Macbeth in Macbeth
Cal Lynch / Aguilar de Nerha in Assassin's Creed
Tom Sherbourne in The Light Between Oceans
Cook in Song to Song
Chad Cutler in Trespass Against Us
Harry Hole in The Snowman
Deckard Shaw in Fast & Furious 6
Deckard Shaw in Furious 7
Deckard Shaw in The Fate of the Furious
Deckard Shaw in Fast & Furious: Hobbs & Shaw
Luke Wright in Safe
Rick Ford in Spy
Nick Wild in Wild Card
Arthur Bishop in Mechanic: Resurrection
Lee Christmas in The Expendables
Lee Christmas in The Expendables 2
Lee Christmas in The Expendables 3
Master Kane in A Kid in King Arthur's Court
Telford Winter in The Trench
Ted Hughes in Sylvia
James Bond in Casino Royale
James Bond in Quantum of Solace
James Bond in Skyfall
James Bond in Spectre
James Bond in No Time to Die
Guy Crouchback in Sword of Honour
Joe in Enduring Love
XXXX in Layer Cake
Christopher Kelso in Archangel
Lord Asriel in The Golden Compass
Joe Scot in Flashbacks of a Fool
Tuvia Bielski in Defiance
Jake Lonergan in Cowboys & Aliens
Ivan Ivanovitch Sakharine in The Adventures of Tintin
Will Atenton / Peter Ward in Dream House
Benoit Blanc in Knives Out
Brian Fantana in Anchorman: The Legend of Ron Burgundy
Brian Fantana in Anchorman 2: The Legend Continues
Josh Lucas in Clueless
Adam Pearl in I Could Never Be Your Woman
Luke Skywalker in Star Wars: Episode VIII – The Last Jedi
Luke Skywalker in Star Wars: Episode IX – The Rise of Skywalker
Don John in Much Ado About Nothing
Siddhartha in Little Buddha
Jack Traven in Speed
Johnny Smith in Johnny Mnemonic
Paul Sutton in A Walk in the Clouds
Eddie Kasalivich in Chain Reaction
Jjaks Clayton in Feeling Minnesota
Julian Mercer in Something's Gotta Give
Henry Torne in Henry's Crime
John Wall in Generation Um...
Kai in 47 Ronin
Evan Webber in Knock Knock
William Beckham in To the Bone
William Foster in Replicas
Keanu Reeves in Always Be My Maybe
Wayne Campbell in Wayne's World
Wayne Campbell in Wayne's World 2
John H. Miller in Saving Private Ryan
Steven Hiller in Independence Day
Robert Clayton Dean in Enemy of the State
Sam Carmichael in Mamma Mia!
Danny O'Neill in Live Wire
Mark Sloan in Grey's Anatomy
Tom Chandler in The Last Ship
Will Schuester in Glee
Trip Tucker in Star Trek: Enterprise
Jim Train in The Safety of Objects
Paul Stanton in Inhale
Richard Stoker in Stoker
Steve Huberbrecht in August: Osage County
Sean Brenner in Insidious: Chapter 3
Lawrence Lanpher in Truth
David Kelly in Dirty Grandpa
Mark Robertson in The Mountain Between Us
László Almásy in The English Patient
Tony Angel in The Good Thief
Michael Ebbs in The Chumscrubber
Joe in Land of the Blind
Stephen Tulloch in Chromophobia
William Cavendish in The Duchess
Caius Martius Coriolanus in Coriolanus
M. Gustave in The Grand Budapest Hotel
Harold Lowe in Titanic
Kevin Shepherd in 102 Dalmatians
Nick Easter in Runaway Jury
Dinky Winks in Spy Kids 2: The Island of Lost Dreams
Dinky Winks in Spy Kids 3-D: Game Over
Shep Wild in Ted 2
Mobius M. Mobius in Loki

References

External links

1960 births
Living people
Male actors from Rome
Italian male voice actors
Italian male film actors
Italian male television actors
20th-century Italian male actors
21st-century Italian male actors